Key lime pie is an American dessert pie and the official state pie of Florida.

Additionally, "Key Lime Pie" or "Key lime pie" stands for:

 Key Lime Pie (band), wrote and recorded the official anthem of the Conch Republic
 Key Lime Pie (album) by Camper Van Beethoven